Scincella incerta  is a species of skink found in southern Mexico, Guatemala, and Honduras, although records from Mexico likely pertain to another species.

References

Scincella
Reptiles of Guatemala
Reptiles of Honduras
Reptiles of Mexico
Reptiles described in 1940
Taxa named by Laurence Cooper Stuart